Alaró is a small municipality in the district of Raiguer on Majorca, one of the Balearic Islands, Spain, Europe.

History
Alarò's origin dates back to the Islamic period. The documented history begins in the thirteenth century, during the reconquest of Mallorca, with its Castillo de Alaro being the center of this. The Castillo de Alaro was built by Christian inhabitants to ward off invasions from pirates.

The town was the first to have an urban electricity network on the island. This event happened on August 15, 1901. Currently, electric distribution is unified with the rest of the island, but as a sign of how important it was for the island of Mallorca, on May 8, 666, the Consell Insular de Mallorca marked the tower of the old factory as a monument of cultural interest.

Geography

Alaró is bounded by Buñola, Escorca, Lloseta, Mancor de la Vall, Binissalem, Consell and Santa María del Camí.

Protected buildings in Alaró
Alaró has a catalog of properties which are protected because of their special characteristics.

Country estates
The municipality's most characteristic image is that of the twin peaks, Castell and s Álcadena, which inspired numerous legends about kings and witches. This panorama is a landmark when entering the village from Consell. However it is also possible to reach Alaro by taking the secondary Ragieur road, the Santa Maria road or by way of Lloseta where there is another kind of scenery to enjoy, perhaps not so spectacular but certainly picturesque.

There are many country estates along these secondary roads, evidence of the rural economy that existed until the advent of tourism: Son Antelm and Son Fiol, on the Santa Maria road, Sa Teulera, on the Coanegegre-Alaro road, Son Penyaflor and Son Curt on the Castell road. Son Palou was an important family of the area. Manor Son Palou was their country estate. Son Forteza, Son Guitart and Son Grau are on the way to Lloseta.

Economy
One of the most important economic activities in Alaró for years was the shoe industry. Alaró municipality once had up to 30 factories and more than 2000 people dedicated to this activity. Today, that industry has been reduced to a minimum, with only one major company in that sector. There were also important lignite mines, now closed, relevant to the activities of electricity generation and distribution. For some time they belonged to the electric company GESA (now part of the Endesa group).

Today, the town of Alaro, like many others on the island has become commuter town, with most of its inhabitants working in the capital of the island (Palma de Mallorca).

References

2. Govern Balear, Alaro Guide to Es Raiguer

External links

Official site

Municipalities in Mallorca
Populated places in Mallorca